"Right Here, Right Now" is a song recorded by Canadian country music artist Charlie Major. It was released in 1999 as the first single from his fourth studio album, 444. It peaked at number 8 on the RPM Country Tracks chart in February 2000.

Chart performance

References

1999 songs
1999 singles
Charlie Major songs
Songs written by Charlie Major